Sentient computer, may refer to:
 Artificial general intelligence, a hypothetical machine that exhibits behavior at least as skillful and flexible as humans do
 Computational theory of mind, the view that human minds are (or can be usefully modeled as) computer programs